The 1912–13 City Cup was the nineteenth edition of the City Cup, a cup competition in Irish football.

The tournament was won by Distillery for the second time.

Group standings

References

1912–13 in Irish association football